Dorset/Kawagama Lake (South) Water Aerodrome  is located  east northeast of Dorset, Ontario Canada.

References

Registered aerodromes in Ontario
Seaplane bases in Ontario